Edward Cahill (born 1927) is an English former professional rugby league footballer who played in the 1950s. He coached Salford in the 1963-64 season.

International honours
Ted Cahill won caps for England while at Rochdale Hornets in 1953 against France and Other Nationalities.

He played for Whites against Reds in a Great Britain tour trial match at Station Road, Swinton on Wednesday 10 March 1954 and kicked a goal in a 20-14 defeat. He was later selected for the tour.

Ted Cahill toured Australasia with Great Britain in 1954. He played in eight tour games, kicking 14 goals.

Ted Cahill represented Great Britain while at Rochdale Hornets in 1954 against France (1 non-Test match).

Along with William "Billy" Banks, Gordon Haynes, Keith Holliday, Billy Ivison, Robert "Bob" Kelly, John McKeown, George Parsons and Ted Slevin, Ted Cahill's only Great Britain appearance came against France prior to 1957, these matches were not considered as Test matches by the Rugby Football League, and consequently caps were not awarded.

References

1927 births
Living people
England national rugby league team players
English rugby league players
Great Britain national rugby league team players
Lancashire rugby league team players
Liverpool City (rugby league) players
Rochdale Hornets players
Rugby league fullbacks
Rugby league players from St Helens, Merseyside
Salford Red Devils coaches